Chhaju Ram Public School, Hisar is a college located in Hisar in the Indian state of Haryana.

History
The college was established in 2003. It is run by the non-profit Jat Educational Institutions society, which also runs CRM JAT College, Chhaju Ram Law College, Hisar, Chhaju Ram College of Education, Hisar, Chhaju Ram Jat Senior Secondary School, Hisar and Chhaju Ram Jat Senior Secondary School, Hisar.

Academics
The schools offer classes till 10+2.

See also 
 List of Universities and Colleges in Hisar
 List of schools in Hisar
 List of institutions of higher education in Haryana

External links 
 Official website

References 

Schools in Hisar (city)
Private schools in Haryana
Boys' schools in India